ZAP was an American electric vehicle company that designed, produced and marketed vehicles including automobiles, motorcycles, bicycles, scooters, personal watercraft, hovercraft, ATVs, neighborhood electric vehicles and commercial vehicles. The name stands for Zero Air Pollution. The company headquarters were located in Santa Rosa, California. The company is presumed to be defunct. The company's last filing with the California Secretary of State business entity database indicates the agent for service of process resigned on October 26, 2016.

History
ZAP Power Systems (for zero air pollution), was launched by Jim McGreen in 1992 with the goal of designing, building and selling innovative electric vehicles. The company was incorporated on September 23, 1994 as ZAP Power Systems of Sebastopol, California, by Jim McGreen, and Gary Starr where they started manufacturing electric-powered kits and bikes and then later the zappy scooter. Gary Starr was chosen as a business partner by Jim McGreen due to his previous experience with producing electric powertrains at companies such as Solar Electric Engineering which was later renamed U.S. Electricar, which converted hundreds of vehicles including trucks for Ford and General Motors to run on electric power and is now known as Enova Systems.

In 1995, ZAP began the manufacturing of electric bicycle systems, including products such as the ZAP DX and SX, as well as the ElectriCruiser, PowerBike, S&W Patrol Bike, ZAPTRIKE.

In 1996, Zap began to offer direct public offering stock, and debuted an advanced Tricyclopod, the Zappy folding electric scooter (invented by co-founder McGreen).

In February 1997, an arrangement was made with Chinese bicycle companies for ZAP's drive system supply. In April 1997, ZAP agreed to sell electric bikes to Brunswick Corp By May 1997, ZAP signed a distribution agreement with Fondmetal Export AG.

In March 1998, Zap's first electric bike store was opened in San Francisco.

In 1999, ZAP Power Systems announced a corporate name change to ZAPWORLD.COM and the company made multiple business agreements with companies such as Smith & Wesson, Veiculos Electricos, CSW Total EV, and Electric Motorbike. and announced the launch of the "Z-Boat".

In late 1999, Gary Starr ousted Jim McGreen as President, and CEO of ZAP, and put himself in charge of the company. 

In May 2000, ZAP introduced a line of sea scooters with battery-powered propulsion, and the KICK-PUSH Scooter. Also, the company appointed John Dabels as President of ZAP following the acquisition of EMB in 1999. Dabels was the former marketing director of the GM EV1 program.

In January 2001, Dabels resigned as President of ZAP due to an unwillingness to relocate manufacturing to Asia.

In 2001, ZAP introduced a solar powered scooter and changed the corporate name of the company to simply "ZAP". ZAP also unveiled the ZAPADAPT, an electric-assist for manual wheelchairs at the 2001 Abilities Expo.

In June 2000, ZAP acquired Aquatic Propulsion Technology Inc, and announced a joint venture with Ningbo Topp Industrial Co. Ltd.

In March 2001, ZAP entered into a strategic alliance with Sun Pirate, In May 2001, ZAP formed a joint venture with Voltage Vehicles to develop, design, manufacture and distribute a full line of electric vehicles.

Around 2002, ZAP filed for Chapter 11 bankruptcy, and reorganized with Gary Starr as the chairman of ZAP. Starr hired Steve Schneider to be the new CEO of ZAP.

In February 2010, ZAP was awarded an engineering contract for the design and development of an electric version of the Grumman LLV, the mail truck used by USPS since 1987. 

By 2017, the ZAPworld.com website seemingly went out of use. The current fate of the company is somewhat unclear.

Expansion into China
In February 2008, ZAP created a joint venture with Chinese company Youngman Automotive Group, to revive the nascent Detroit Electric brand.

In December 2009, a joint venture company in Hangzhou, China was formed by ZAP, Holley Group, and Better World International, named ZAP Hangzhou.

In July 2010, ZAP confirmed an agreement to acquire a stake in Zhejiang Jonway Automobile. Approval to do so was confirmed by the Chinese Department of Commerce in Zhejiang Province in September 2010.

In June 2014, ZAP announced a major deal with battery maker Tianjin Battery Company Ltd, also known as Lishen to convert 1,000 fleet vehicles to use electric power only.

Business units
ZAP had two primary business units: ZAP Electric Vehicles and ZAP Recharge-It-All.

ZAP Electric Vehicles
The company operated a lease and finance program for sales of its automotive product line which included the ZAPTRUCK XL and ZAPVAN Shuttle, two low-speed vehicles for the fleet market, the ZAP Xebra Truck and Sedan, and also developed and commercialized electric power-assist system motor kits for bicycles, as well as electric bicycles, electric ATVs and personal electric scooters.

The wholly owned subsidiaries were: Voltage Vehicles, a Nevada company engaged in the distribution and sale of advanced technology and conventional automobiles; ZAPWorld Stores, Inc., engaged in consumer sales of ZAP products in one location; ZAP Manufacturing, Inc., also a Nevada company, engaged in the distribution of ZAP products; RAP Group, Inc., was engaged in the sale and liquidation of conventional automobiles; and ZAP Rental Outlet, a Nevada company. (ZAP World Outlet, ZAP Rental Outlet and RAP Group are now inactive subsidiaries).

ZAP Recharge-It-All
This division was focused on portable energy solutions or (batteries), the company through the Recharge-It-All line sold battery packs to power or charge a range of mobile electronics such as cellular phones, digital cameras and laptops, providing significantly more charge time than available technologies. The Portable Energy devices fell under two product lines. It included universal chargers and iPOD models and the iPhone. The universal chargers were rechargeable battery packs that extended the use of small and medium-sized electronic devices up to two to five times their normal battery life.

Fleet vehicles
The reorganized ZAP's market strategy was announced to cover fleet needs, with four tangible products launched until date, the ZAP Xebra (2006), ZAP Dude ATV (2008), ZAP Truck XL (2008) and the ZAP Shuttle Van (2008).

ZAP Xebra

Serves Domino's Pizza delivery service in Las Vegas, Aspen in the US, Coca-Cola distribution model in Montevideo, Uruguay and includes an adapted version: The Xebra Truck. The United Parcel Service (UPS) in Northern California combines a fleet of Xebra trucks and sedans to expand small parcel deliveries, after UPS delivery vans transfer smaller packages to locked storage unit, an electric Xebra car/truck transports packages into dense urban and residential areas where parking and traffic are easier for the smaller vehicles. After several hundred vehicles were produced, the production of this vehicle was phased out in 2009.

 Xebra Legal Issues: Massachusetts
According to a July 2008 editorial in Wired magazine, motorists in Massachusetts were unable to register the ZAP Xebra legally, because the vehicle did not fit the state's definition of either a car or a motorcycle. Registrants of ZAP Xebras received letters from the state's Registry of Motor Vehicles stating that their vehicle registration plates had been revoked and their registrations were invalid.

 Resolution
Both the United States House of Representatives and United States Senate overrode Massachusetts state law, when they passed legislation on December 31, 2009; allowing three-wheeled motor vehicles in Boston roads. The change was achieved through joint efforts by the Registry of Motor Vehicles, state Senator Robert L. Hedlund from Weymouth, Massachusetts, and state Representative Garrett J. Bradley from Hingham, Massachusetts.

ZAP Dude ATV
Is the cheapest in the company's electric vehicle portfolio, been introduced to natural reserve patrols, US Military and agriculture and farming markets, where usage is scheduled and power stations are strategically located.

Dude ATV specifications

 There was an attached statement that range would vary depending on hill grade, speed, and rider weight.

ZAP Truck XL
The U.S. Military has been putting the vehicle to test by engaging them into logistics tasks since 2009.

Products under development

ZAP-X
The ZAP-X is an electric crossover SUV previously expected to be launched in 2008 by ZAP and Lotus Engineering based on the Lotus APX prototype platform. This product has not been offered for sale to the public.

ZAP Electric SUV/Taxi
ZAP is developing the ZAP Electric SUV/Taxi, an all-electric family SUV, tested at the Korea Electric Vehicle Challenge from March to early April, an on-road multistage demonstration event of three rest and recharge stops that includes a 220 km freeway rally at average speeds of 80–85 km/h(52.8 mph). Vehicle presented ahead of the Beijing International Automotive Exhibition by the CEO of ZAP, Steve Schneider, as the company latest effort. The model was also available with a fuel efficient engine based on Jonway's A380 platform,.

ZAP Alias Roadster

The ZAP Alias Roadster is a plug-in electric three-wheeled sports car from the American electric car maker ZAP that was originally scheduled to go into production in 2009, with two wheels at the front, each containing an electric wheel-motor, and one at the rear, the project initiated in 2007 through a collaboration between ZAP and Lotus Engineering, the UK-based automotive engineering company, who are assisting with the development of the vehicle. Was supposed to have gone into production in 2009. The vehicle was a finalist at the 2010 Progressive Insurance X Prize driven by Al Unser Jr., but was eliminated due to mechanical failure in the 97th mile of a 100-mile track event.

Controversies

Fraud allegations
It has been reported by Wired that "ZAP has taken millions from investors and dealers eager to see the company's line of green cars hit the road. But that line has never materialized." Reportedly, ZAP board members made misleading claims about the company's prospects, allowing them to enrich themselves at the expense of dealers who bought franchises and did not receive the cars that they were expecting to sell.

Although such claims were not verified, ZAP has been criticized for over-issuing stock and warrants while failing to expand the model lineup or show significant profit. While the company sold the low-end Xebra models for a number of years, more expensive, higher-performance models have been repeatedly announced but not produced. 

Due to this controversy, there have been allegations about ZAP being an investment scam.

Smart Car dispute
In 2004, Daimler Chrysler abandoned their Smart Car division in the United States, claiming that there was not enough demand for the product. In 2005, ZAP took the initiative and started Americanizing Smart Cars they purchased from European dealers. In doing so they secured orders totaling $2.2 billion.

In the case ZAP v. Daimler Chrysler AG, et al., Superior Court of California, County of Los Angeles, Case No. BC342211. On October 28, 2005, ZAP filed a complaint against Daimler Chrysler Corporation and others in the Los Angeles Superior Court. The complaint includes claims for intentional and negligent interference with prospective economic relations, trade libel, defamation, breach of contract - agreement to negotiate in good faith, breach of implied covenant of good faith and fair dealing, and unfair competition. The complaint alleges that Daimler Chrysler has engaged in a series of anti-competitive tactics aimed at defaming ZAP and disrupting its third-party business relationships. As a result of the allegations, the complaint requests damages in excess of $500 million per claim and such other relief as the court deems just and proper.

ZAP sold shares and dealer franchises, partially based on its intention to sell and finance the retrofitting of the Smart Car to USA standards. The importation and conversion to meet US safety and EPA regulations was engineered and performed by G&K Automotive of Santa Ana, CA. Zap quoted mileage figures for the car as being in the mid 40 range. This calculation was taken from UK test figures and was based on the larger(+20%) Imperial gallon. When tested by the EPA at their Ann Arbor lab, it was found that true mpg figures were in the low to mid 30s, but Daimler-Chrysler, the Smart car's manufacturer, said that ZAP's behavior revealed "both the sham nature of its purported business and a lack of trustworthiness that is nothing short of stunning." Although ZAP never claimed to have a deal with Daimler Chrysler directly, according to filed reports ZAP was the first company to import Smart cars to the US and did sell 300 Smart cars that it bought from independent Daimler-Chrysler distributors, it also filed suit against Daimler-Chrysler in California for libel and business interference. ZAP won the initial filings but Daimler won a later appeal based solely on jurisdiction.

Franklin, Kentucky plant
Plans to begin construction of a manufacturing plant in Franklin, Kentucky, were announced by ZAP in August 2008, but construction plans were halted in November 2008 due to the 2007-2008 financial crisis. ZAP planned on contracting Integrity Manufacturing LLC to build and operate the plant while maintaining ownership of the plant. The plant was expected to bring 4,000 jobs to the town of Franklin. 

The plant was controversial due to the fact that the state of Kentucky had been expected to subsidize the plant with taxpayer money. In addition, ZAP was offered various tax incentives such as tax exemptions and rebates.

See also
 Battery electric vehicle

References

External links

 Official website
 

Vehicle manufacturing companies established in 1994
Battery electric vehicle manufacturers
Sports car manufacturers
Electric vehicle manufacturers of the United States
Companies based in Santa Rosa, California
Companies traded over-the-counter in the United States